Ancyrodella is an extinct genus of conodonts from the Late Devonian.

During the Famennian stage of the Late Devonian, a biologic event occurred (Upper Kellwasser Extinction of all Ancyrodella and Ozarkodina and most Palmatolepis, Polygnathus and Ancyrognathus).

References

External links 
 
 

Conodont genera
Devonian conodonts
Paleozoic life of Ontario